Acanthocephala alata is a species of leaf-footed bug in the family Coreidae. It is native to Mexico  and can be found from Texas to Colombia.

References

Further reading

 

Acanthocephalini
Insects described in 1835
Taxa named by Hermann Burmeister